José Rui Lopes Águas (born 28 April 1960) is a Portuguese former professional footballer who played as a striker, and is a current manager.

He had highly successful spells at two of the biggest clubs in Portugal, Benfica and Porto, amassing Primeira Liga totals of 292 games and 121 goals over 12 seasons.

Águas represented the Portugal national team at the 1986 World Cup.

Playing career

Club
Born in Lisbon, Águas started his career with amateurs Real Desportivo Benfica, and later went on to represent G.D. Sesimbra in the Terceira Divisão and Atlético Clube de Portugal in Segunda Divisão. He turned professional in the 1983–84 season, when he signed for Portimonense S.C. of the Primeira Liga.

Moving to S.L. Benfica in 1985, Águas scored an average of 12 goals in his first spell, helping the capital club to the league on three occasions. He was present at the 1988 European Cup final, as they lost 6–5 on penalties to PSV Eindhoven.

Águas joined FC Porto in summer 1988, winning the league in his second year and contributing to the conquest with 17 goals. However, he returned to Benfica after only two years, and proceeded to net a career-best 25 times in the first season upon his return as the team finished in top position. In the last round against S.C. Beira-Mar, the game after they had been crowned champions, he bagged two second-half goals in an eventual 3–0 home win, narrowly edging Porto's Domingos – who played first and scored four in a 5–0 victory over Vitória de Guimarães, finishing with 24 – in the Bola de Prata race.

In the last edition of the European Cup, Águas suffered an horrific foot injury against FC Dynamo Kyiv, but still managed five league goals in only 14 matches. Already 34, he moved clubs but stayed in Lisbon, joining lowly C.F. Estrela da Amadora. His career ended after an abroad spell which was his first and only at the age of 34, at Italy's A.C. Reggiana 1919.

International
Águas played his first match for Portugal on 3 April 1985, a 0–2 loss to Italy in a friendly. He was present at the 1986 FIFA World Cup, playing as a substitute in the 1–3 defeat against Morocco.

In total, Águas received 31 caps for the national team, scoring ten goals. His last game was for the 1994 World Cup qualifiers on 17 November 1993, losing to Italy 1–0.

Coaching career
In the early 2000s, Águas coached Vitória F.C. and acted as assistant at C.S. Marítimo and S.C. Braga. He managed six wins, three draws and nine losses for the first side in the 1999–2000 campaign, which ended in top-division relegation.

Águas was named Cape Verde coach in August 2014, replacing interim Men Ramires and signing a two-year contract. He led them to three draws in the 2015 Africa Cup of Nations, in an eventual group phase elimination. He resigned from his position on 1 January 2016, alleging unpaid wages.

In February 2017, Águas was part of a candidate shortlist for the vacant Rwanda national team manager role. He returned to the Cape Verde helm in May of the following year.

Águas returned to club duties in late December 2019, being included in his compatriot Jesualdo Ferreira's staff at Santos FC of the Campeonato Brasileiro Série A.

Personal life
Águas' father, José, was a stellar footballer (also striker) for Benfica, mainly in the 1950s. He had two siblings, his sister Maria Helena (known as Lena d'Água) having a prolific career in the country's pop music. His cousin, Raul Águas, was also a footballer and manager for several years. 

Águas met his wife, Leonor, in college as they were from the same class. They fathered three children, son André (born in 1985), daughter Mariana (1987, who went on to work as a reporter at CMTV) and son Martim (1993) who was also a footballer.

Career statistics

Club

International

International goals

|}

Managerial statistics

Honours

Club
Benfica
Primeira Liga: 1986–87, 1990–91, 1993–94
Taça de Portugal: 1985–86, 1986–87, 1992–93
Supertaça Cândido de Oliveira: 1985

Porto
Primeira Liga: 1989–90
Supertaça Cândido de Oliveira runner-up: 1988

Individual
Primeira Liga top scorer: 1990–91
European Cup top scorer: 1987–88
Taça de Portugal top scorer: 1985–86

See also
List of association football families

References

External links

1960 births
Living people
Footballers from Lisbon
Portuguese footballers
Association football forwards
Primeira Liga players
Liga Portugal 2 players
G.D. Sesimbra footballers
Atlético Clube de Portugal players
Portimonense S.C. players
S.L. Benfica footballers
FC Porto players
C.F. Estrela da Amadora players
Serie A players
A.C. Reggiana 1919 players
Portugal under-21 international footballers
Portugal international footballers
1986 FIFA World Cup players
UEFA Champions League top scorers
Portuguese expatriate footballers
Expatriate footballers in Italy
Portuguese expatriate sportspeople in Italy
Portuguese football managers
Primeira Liga managers
G.D. Estoril Praia managers
Vitória F.C. managers
Cape Verde national football team managers
2015 Africa Cup of Nations managers
Portuguese expatriate football managers
Expatriate football managers in Cape Verde
Portuguese expatriate sportspeople in Cape Verde
Portuguese expatriate sportspeople in Brazil
Santos FC non-playing staff